These are the official results of the Men's triple jump event at the 1998 European Championships in Budapest, Hungary. There were a total number of 32 participating athletes, with two qualifying groups and the final held on Sunday August 23, 1998. The top twelve and ties, and all those reaching 16.90 metres advanced to the final. The qualification round was held in Saturday August 22, 1998.

Medalists

Abbreviations
All results shown are in metres

Records

Qualification

Group A

Group B

Final

See also
 1997 Men's World Championships Triple Jump (Athens)
 1999 Men's World Championships Triple Jump (Seville)

References
 Results
 todor66

Triple jump
Triple jump at the European Athletics Championships